George Mueller may refer to:
George Mueller (NASA) (1918–2015), American engineer who served as an associate administrator at NASA
George Müller (1805–1898), Christian evangelist and coordinator of orphanages in England
George Mueller (Boardwalk Empire), the alias used by Nelson Van Alden in the TV series Boardwalk Empire

See also
Georg Müller (disambiguation)